The 2007 Wisconsin Badgers football team represented the University of Wisconsin–Madison during the 2007 NCAA Division I FBS football season. Led by head coach Bret Bielema, the Badgers completed the season with a 9–4 record, including a 5–3 mark in Big Ten Conference play. The season ended with a loss in the Outback Bowl to Tennessee, 21–17.

Previous season
The 2006 Wisconsin Badgers football team was unranked going into the season with first year head coach Bret Bielema.  After a tough loss to Michigan, the Badgers rebounded and finished the season 11-1, tying the Wolverines for second in the Big Ten.  The Badgers then defeated the Arkansas Razorbacks, 17–14, in the Capital One Bowl finishing the season ranked #5 in the Coaches' Poll and #7 in the AP Poll.

Schedule

Game summaries

Washington State

UNLV

The Citadel

Iowa

Michigan State

Illinois

Wisconsin's dreams of an undefeated season were snapped in Champaign-Urbana, as the Illini stunned the 5th ranked Badgers 31–25. A poor showing by the Badgers, combined with excellent efforts across the board for the Illini, sunk the Badgers, who fell to 2–1 in the Big Ten and 5–1 overall despite an incredible effort by QB Tyler Donovan, who completed 27 passes on 49 attempts for 392 yards and 2 TDs. Illinois's defense sacked Donovan twice and forced a pair of INTs (one by Vontae Davis, the other by Kevin Mitchell). Illinois RB Rashard Mendenhall ran wild on the Badgers for 160 yards and 2 TDs on just 19 carries, and QB Juice Williams dissected Wisconsin through the air and on the ground. Williams completed 12 passes on 19 attempts for 121 yards, and ran for 92 yards on 14 carries.

Penn State

Wisconsin RB P.J. Hill fumbled on his very first carry of the game, and Wisconsin simply collapsed in Happy Valley, losing 38–7 to Penn State. Wisconsin QB Tyler Donovan had a bad game, as he threw 2 INTs, was sacked 5 times, and averaged just 1.1 YPC on 11 carries. The Wisconsin defense, put in often impossible situations by the ineptitude of their offense (Wisconsin turned the ball over 3 times and committed 8 penalties), caved under pressure from Penn State. Wisconsin P Ken Debauche punted 6 times on the day.

Penn State RB Rodney Kinlaw ran for 115 yards and a touchdown on 23 carries, and WR Deon Butler caught 7 passes for 93 yards and the only passing touchdown of the day by either team. However, the leading receiver of the game was Wisconsin WR Kyle Jefferson, who caught 6 passes for 124 yards.

Northern Illinois

Indiana

Ohio State

At one point in the game, Wisconsin led Ohio State 17–10, but a big 4th Quarter from the Buckeyes offense and defense secured an eventual Ohio State victory. The game snapped a 2-game winning streak by the Badgers over Ohio State (from the 2003 and 2004 seasons) and improved Jim Tressel's record to 2–3 against Wisconsin.

Michigan

Wisconsin pounded Lloyd Carr's Michigan team 37–21 for their second consecutive home win over the Wolverines, and Bret Bielema's second win over a ranked opponent (his first was against Michigan State). Carr benched both QB Chad Henne and RB Mike Hart so they would both be healthy against Ohio State next week.

Wisconsin rattled off 17 unanswered points to open the game; starting with a Travis Beckum touchdown reception off a 10-yard pass from Tyler Donovan, a Taylor Mehlhaff field goal, and a 2-yard TD run by Donovan. Michigan answered with a 12-yard touchdown pass from Ryan Mallett to WR Mario Manningham for their only score of the first half. Wisconsin got another Mehlhaff FG with 0:15 remaining in the half and led 20-7 at halftime.

Both teams had a sluggish third quarter; the only points scored by either team came on a 19-yard FG by Taylor Mehlhaff for Wisconsin. However, Wisconsin and Michigan scored a pair of touchdowns apiece in the 4th quarter; Michigan getting a record setting 97 yard touchdown reception by Mario Manningham and a 26-yard TD pass from Mallett to WR Adrian Arrington and Wisconsin answering with a pair of touchdown runs by RB Zach Brown.

Wisconsin's starting RB P.J. Hill managed a grand total of 14 yards on 5 carries. Zach Brown, his backup, ran for 108 yards on 28 carries with a pair of TDs. Wisconsin WR Paul Hubbard made 7 receptions for 134 yards, and TE Travis Beckum caught 6 passes for 106 yards with a touchdown reception.

The Badgers improved to 8–3 on the year, and face 1-10 Minnesota next week in Minneapolis. With a win over Ohio State next week, Michigan could win the Big Ten outright.

Minnesota

Tennessee

Season Summary
After a 5–0 start, Wisconsin lost its next two games (to Illinois and Penn State, both on the road). Wins in 4 of their next 5 clinched a 9–3 regular season, but poor showings against Penn State and Ohio State, as well as a below-average effort against Tennessee in the postseason, put a dampener on an otherwise successful season for the Badgers.

Roster

Regular starters

Team players selected in the 2008 NFL Draft

References

Wisconsin
Wisconsin Badgers football seasons
Wisconsin Badgers football